IL-16 or IL 16 can refer to:
 Interleukin 16
 Illinois's 16th congressional district
 Illinois Route 16
 Ilyushin Il-16